Wolf's Castle Halt railway station was on the Clarbeston Road and Letterston line of the Great Western Railway. It served the villages of Wolf's Castle and Ford between 1913 and 1964.

History
The Clarbeston Road and Letterston Railway, s subsidiary of the Great Western Railway (GWR), was opened on 30 August 1906, but at first there were no intermediate stations. However, there was a signal box at Wolf's Castle, because although most of the route was built as double track, a portion near the middle, which included Spittal Tunnel and the cutting through Treffgarne Gorge, was single-track, and it was necessary to have signal boxes at each end of the single-track section. The single-track section was later doubled, but although the temporary signal boxes at Spittal and Treffgarne closed with the introduction of full double-track working on 17 December 1906, Wolf's Castle signal box was retained to break the section, allowing two trains to proceed in the same direction between Clarbeston Road and Letterston simultaneously; there was also a crossover.

The first of three intermediate stations to open on the line was Wolf's Castle Halt on 1 October 1913. Unusually for a GWR halt, the two platforms were built of brick rather than wood, as were the shelters. The station nameboards stated "Wolf's Castle Halt for Treffgarne Rocks".

The station closed on 6 April 1964, as did all the other stations between Clarbeston Road and Fishguard Harbour.

In 2011, the waiting shelters on the platforms no longer exist and the line has been reduced to a single track positioned about halfway between the platforms, which would prevent any future use. The track is also raised on an embankment of ballast, so even if it was still alongside the platform the train doors would be some distance above the platform height.

Notes

References

External links
Wolf's Castle Halt on navigable 1954 O.S. map
Wolfs Castle Halt, photo taken in 2006

Disused railway stations in Pembrokeshire
Former Great Western Railway stations
Railway stations in Great Britain opened in 1913
Railway stations in Great Britain closed in 1964
Beeching closures in Wales
1913 establishments in Wales